Andrew Brown (born 21 May 1977) is a New Zealand sailor. He competed at the 2004 Summer Olympics in Athens, in the men's 470 class.

References

1977 births
Living people
New Zealand male sailors (sport)
Olympic sailors of New Zealand
Sailors at the 2004 Summer Olympics – 470